America can't do a damn thing against us is a slogan originally used by the former Supreme Leader of Iran, Ayatollah Ruhollah Khomeini during the Iran hostage crisis, for the first time to assure the Iranians that the United States would not be able to restore the ousted Shah of Iran back to the Iranian throne. The statement then became an unofficial slogan for the Iranian Revolution which resulted in the establishment of an Islamic Republic under Khomeini's rule.

Application
Responding to Iran's request for extradition of the Shah of Iran Muhammad Reza Pahlavi, the President of the United States, Jimmy Carter, provided for the Shah's travel plans to Panama. By doing so, Carter sought to eliminate the possibility of the extradition in exchange for hostages who were held by the revolutionary Iran for 444 days (November 4, 1979, to January 20, 1981) after a group of Iranian revolutionary students affiliated with Muslim Student Followers of the Imam's Line broke into and entered the Embassy of the United States of America in Tehran, and took its diplomatic staff hostage. This, in turn, had been an action in response to the US offering political asylum to the Shah. A week after the incident, the sheets and finances of Iran were confiscated by US. Yet, in spite of what were deemed by Iran to be international threats, there was still the possibility of holding trials for alleged American spies, and the reaction of Ayatollah Khomeini against the threat of Carter published regularly by international media, was the slogan "America can't do a damn thing against us."

The slogan appeared on many walls and banners such as a billboard along the Iran-Iraq border, and a banner which was hung in front of the U.S captured RQ-170 drone.

The slogan was also used by Ali Khamenei, Khomeini's successor, or alluded to in varied form. It was also used by some other Iranian officials.

References

External links
 The lecture of Ayatollah Khomeini in which he used the slogan for the first time

Iran–United States relations
Iran hostage crisis
Political catchphrases
Political quotes
Slogans
1979 neologisms
Anti-Americanism
Political terminology of Iran
Ruhollah Khomeini